The 1918 Maryland State Aggies football team was an American football team that represented Maryland State College (which in 1920 became part of the University of Maryland) in the 1918 college football season. In their eighth season under head coach Curley Byrd, the Aggies compiled a 4–1–1 record, and outscored all opponents by a total of 57 to 35.

Due to the United States' participation in World War I, the 1918 team was not selected from the general student body. Instead, the team was a Students' Army Training Corps squad.

Schedule

References

Maryland State
Maryland Terrapins football seasons
Maryland State Aggies football